Bazgir-e Qaleh Parvar (also Romanized as Bāzgīr-e Qal‘eh Parvar; also known as Bāzgar, Bāzgīr, and Mojtame‘-e Maskūnī-ye Bāzgīr va Qal‘eh Parvar) is a village in Howmeh-ye Sarpol Rural District, in the Central District of Sarpol-e Zahab County, Kermanshah Province, Iran. At the 2006 census, its population was 408, in 95 families.

References 

Populated places in Sarpol-e Zahab County